The 2017 GT4 European Series Northern Cup was the tenth season of the GT4 European Series Northern Cup, a sports car championship created and organised by the Stéphane Ratel Organisation (SRO). It was the first season after it was renamed from GT4 European Series to GT4 European Series Northern Cup.

Calendar
At the annual press conference during the 2016 24 Hours of Spa on 29 July, the Stéphane Ratel Organisation announced the first draft of the 2017 calendar. The final calendar was announced on 23 December. The series started at Misano on 1 April and ended at the Nürburgring on 17 September. Misano and the Nürburgring made their return on the schedule after a one-year absence, while Brands Hatch was on the schedule for the first time in the series' history. The rounds at Monza and Silverstone were discontinued and the round in Pau would be part of the Southern Cup.

Entry list
Starting from the third round at the Red Bull Ring, the series decided to introduce a Silver Cup category, splitting Silver-Silver pairings from the Pro (now Pro-Am) category. This was done with retroactive character to apply for the already held rounds in Misano and Brands Hatch, with fully revised results and standings released.

Race results
Bold indicates overall winner.

Championship standings
Scoring system
Championship points were awarded for the first ten positions in each race. Entries were required to complete 75% of the winning car's race distance in order to be classified and earn points. Individual drivers were required to participate for a minimum of 25 minutes in order to earn championship points in any race.

Drivers' championship

Teams' championship

See also
2017 GT4 European Series Southern Cup

Notes

References

External links

GT4 European Series
GT4 European Series Northern Cup
GT4 European Series Northern Cup